The Wild Boys is a 2017 French film directed by Bertrand Mandico. Set in the beginning of the 20th century on the island of La Réunion, it is about five adolescent boys from wealthy families who commit a brutal crime and are in turn taken in by a Dutch Captain for rehabilitation on his dilapidated sailboat, who sail for a tropical island on which they will secretly be changed into women.
Notably, all the five male protagonists in the film were played by female actors.

Cast
 Vimala Pons - Jean-Louis
 Anaël Snoek - Tanguy
 Diane Rouxel - Hubert
 Mathilde Warnier - Sloane	
 Pauline Lorillard - Romuald
 Sam Louwyck - Le Capitaine	
 Elina Löwensohn - Séverin(e)

Release
The film premiered in the 74th Venice International Film Festival under the International Critics' Week and won the Mario Serandrei – Hotel Saturnia Award for the Best Technical Contribution.

Reception
The Wild Boys received mostly positive reviews from critics upon its release. On Rotten Tomatoes, the film holds an approval rating of 89% based on 18 reviews. On Metacritic it has a weighted average score of 64 out of 100, based on 5 critics, indicating "generally favorable reviews".

Cath Clarke of The Guardian called the film an "uninhibited, deeply bizarre sex-swap drama". She wrote: "Some might find the movie outrageously self-indulgent, but I was drawn into its hermetically sealed world of oddness – and Mandico pays attention to character to a degree that experimental film-makers often don’t bother with. [...]  Mandico has made a wildly strange debut, striking enough to make you sit up and pay attention." Andrew Todd of Birth.Movies.Death noted that "there's also a robust streak of eroticism running through the whole film." He wrote: "It’s the kind of eroticism that would probably make you feel dirty if you really interrogated what you were watching, but it’s achieved with such wide-eyed innocence and tactile texture that you never even think about doing so."

Film magazine Cahiers du cinéma ranked The Wild Boys #1 in its 2018 list of Top Ten films.

References

External links
 

2017 films
2010s French-language films
Bisexuality-related films
Films about intersex
Transgender-related films
French LGBT-related films
2017 LGBT-related films
LGBT-related science fiction films
2010s French films